Basauri is the southern terminus of line 2 of the Bilbao metro. The station is located in the municipality of Basauri, part of the Bilbao metropolitan area. It opened in 2011.

History 

The station was opened on 11 November 2011, the second metro station in Basauri after Ariz. It was the newest station on line 2 until the opening of Kabiezes in 2014.

Station layout 

Basauri station follows the typical cavern-shaped layout of most underground Metro Bilbao stations designed by Norman Foster, with the main hall located directly above the rail tracks.

Access 

   Basozelai St., next to the City Hall (Basozelai exit, closed during the night time services)
  2 Bidasoa St. (Bidasoa exit)
   23 Gipuzkoa St. (Gipuzkoa exit)

Services 
The station is served by line 2 to Kabiezes with headways from five to ten minutes. Bus stops near the station are served by Bizkaibus regional services.

References

External links
 

Line 2 (Bilbao metro) stations
Railway stations in Spain opened in 2011
2011 establishments in the Basque Country (autonomous community)